Nigella is a genus of 18 species of annual plants in the family Ranunculaceae, native to Southern Europe, North Africa, South Asia, Southwest Asia and Middle East. Common names applied to members of this genus are nigella, devil-in-a-bush or love-in-a-mist.

The flowers are white, yellow, pink, pale blue or pale purple, with five to ten petals. The fruit is a capsule composed of several united follicles, each containing numerous seeds; in some species (e.g. Nigella damascena), the capsule is large and inflated.

Uses

Culinary

The seeds of Nigella sativa, known as kalonji, black cumin, black caraway, black coriander, roman coriander, black onion seed, onion seed, charnushka, git (in historical Roman cuisine), or just nigella, are used as a spice and a condiment in South Asian cuisine, Ethiopian cuisine, Middle Eastern and Polish cuisines.

Garden flowers

Several species are grown as ornamental plants in gardens. Nigella damascena has been grown in English cottage gardens since the Elizabethan era, commonly called love-in-a-mist. Nigella hispanica is a taller species with larger blue flowers, red stamens, and grey leaves. Nigella seeds are self-sowing if the seed pods are left to mature.

The dried seed capsules can also be used in flower arrangements.

Use in health care
In traditional medicine, the seeds are used as a carminative and stimulant to ease bowel and indigestion problems, and are given to treat intestinal worms, nerve defects, to reduce flatulence, and induce sweating. Dried pods are sniffed to restore a lost sense of smell. It is also used to repel some insects, much like mothballs.

Numerous studies have shown that it has anti-inflammatory,anti-oxidative,anti-mycotic,antibacterial, anti-fungal, anti-cancer, anti-viral, antihistamine properties, possessing many properties that make it a potential remedy against certain diseases.

Black cumin is used in naturopathy. Black cumin oil or powder are used in the treatment of pathologies such as skin diseases, muscle pain, eczema or psoriasis, but also acne, diabetes, asthma, non-androgenic hair loss... A 2014 study showed its positive effects on the harmful effects of radiotherapy treatments.

Nigella oil contains almost 60% linoleic acid (omega 6).

It is available in capsule, oil or powder form, with both internal and external uses (in massages).

In Silico study of 96 phytochemical compounds of Nigella sativa, identifying Nigelladine A as the most promising compound for SARS-CoV-2 inhibition with the highest docking scores for the spike protein and Mpro. 
Thymoquinone is a phytochemical compound found in the plant Nigella sativa. 
Dithymoquinone, kaempferol, Nigelladine B, Nigellidine, and Nigellidine sulphate also showed high docking scores.

References

External links 

 
Ranunculaceae genera